Bilge is a village in the Mazıdağı District of Mardin Province in Turkey. The village is populated by Kurds of the Barava tribe and had a population of 150 in 2021.

Wedding party massacre

On May 4, 2009, gunmen killed 44 people at a wedding party in Bilge, using grenades and automatic weapons.

References

Villages in Mazıdağı District
Kurdish settlements in Mardin Province